The 40th South American Junior Championships in Athletics were held from October 18–20, 2013 at the Estadio Jaime Zapata in Resistencia, Chaco, Argentina.

Medal summary
Complete results were published.

Men

Women

Medal table (unofficial)
A medal count was published.  There is a slight difference to an unofficial medal count.  However, another source supports the number of 7 gold medals for Colombia as published below.

Team scores
Team scores were published.

Participation
The participation of 273 athletes (including 2 guests) from 12 countries (including 1 guest country) is published.

 (60)
 (7)
 (77) 
 (11)
 (22)
 (27)
 Panamá (5)
 (13)
 Perú (20)
 (3)
 (26)

Guest country:

 (2)

References

Results
RESULTADOS 20.10.2013 . CONSUDATLE. Retrieved on 2013-10-26.

South American U20 Championships in Athletics
South American Junior Championships in Athletics
South American Junior Championships in Athletics
International athletics competitions hosted by Argentina
2013 in South American sport
2013 in youth sport